Samuel Paul Cunningham (born January 18, 1989) is a Thai professional footballer who plays as a goalkeeper of Thai League 2 club Nakhon Si United.

Personal life
Cunningham was born in Nonthaburi to an African American father and a Thai mother.

International career
Cunningham received his first call-up to the senior Thai national team for the friendlies against India on September 4 and 8, 2010.

Honours

Club
Muangthong United
 Thailand Division 2 League (1): 2007
 Thailand Division 1 League (1): 2008

Air Force Central 
 Thai Division 1 League (1): 2013

 Lamphun Warriors
 Thai League 2 (1): 2021–22

References

External links
 

1989 births
Living people
Samuel Cunningham
Samuel Cunningham
Samuel Cunningham
Samuel Cunningham
Association football goalkeepers
Samuel Cunningham
Samuel Cunningham
Samuel Cunningham
Samuel Cunningham
Samuel Cunningham
Samuel Cunningham
Samuel Cunningham
Samuel Cunningham
Samuel Cunningham
Samuel Cunningham
Samuel Cunningham
Samuel Cunningham
Samuel Cunningham
Samuel Cunningham
Footballers at the 2010 Asian Games
Samuel Cunningham
Nakhon Si United F.C. players